That Was Then, This Is Now is the sixth studio album by rap group Tha Dogg Pound. It was released on November 24, 2009.

Track listing

References 

2009 albums
Tha Dogg Pound albums
Albums produced by Swizz Beatz
Albums produced by Lil Jon
Albums produced by Daz Dillinger